The 2022 Honda Indy Toronto was the tenth round of the 2022 IndyCar season. The race was held on July 17, 2022, in Toronto, Ontario, Canada at the Exhibition Place circuit. The race consisted of 85 laps and was won by Scott Dixon.

Entry list

Practice

Practice 1

Practice 2

Qualifying

Qualifying classification 

 Notes
 Bold text indicates fastest time set in session.

Warmup

Race 
The race started at 3:30 PM ET on July 17, 2022.

Race classification

Championship standings after the race 

Drivers' Championship standings

Engine manufacturer standings

 Note: Only the top five positions are included.

References

2022
Honda Indy Toronto
Honda Indy Toronto
Honda Indy Toronto
Honda Indy Toronto